Pamela Catherine Gidley (June 11, 1965  – April 16, 2018) was an American actress and model. She began her career as an actress in 1986, debuting in the film Thrashin', before appearing in a number of films, including Dudes (1987), Cherry 2000 (1987), The Blue Iguana (1988), Permanent Record (1988), Highway to Hell (1992), Twin Peaks: Fire Walk with Me (1992),  Jane Austen's Mafia (1998), and The Little Vampire (2000). 

Gidley is also known for her roles in television series, including Strange Luck as Audrey Weston (1995–1996), and her recurring role as Brigitte on The Pretender (1997–2000).

Biography

Early life
Gidley was born in Methuen, Massachusetts, and raised in Salem, New Hampshire, the third of four siblings and the only daughter. She had two older brothers, Glenn and Daniel, and one younger brother, Brian.

She won the Wilhemina Modeling Agency's "Most Beautiful Girl in the World" contest on March 12, 1985, in Sydney, Australia. As her modeling career had taken off, Gidley studied acting at the New York Academy of Dramatic Art under actress and acting teacher Stella Adler, who ran the Stella Adler Studio of Acting. She eventually moved to Los Angeles to pursue her career in acting.

Career
Gidley made her acting debut in the 1986 film Thrashin'. She appeared in several films of the 1980s including Dudes, Permanent Record, The Blue Iguana, and Cherry 2000. Gidley starred in many films throughout the 1990s, including Twin Peaks: Fire Walk with Me, a prequel to the short-lived television series; Disturbed, alongside Malcolm McDowell; Highway to Hell; the comedy Jane Austen's Mafia!; the comedy horror Aberration, a film in which she starred in the lead role; and Kiss & Tell, a film in which Gidley also served as producer. In 2000, she appeared in the family comedy The Little Vampire. Her last film was the direct-to-video comedy Cake Boy.

Gidley is perhaps best known for her roles in television series. Her first appearance in television was in an episode of the action adventure series MacGyver.  She had three appearances as Army Lieutenant Nikki Raines in Tour of Duty during the 1987–1988 season.  She also had the recurring role of Brigitte Parker in The Pretender. Her character was the first to be introduced on the show's official website before any of the episodes had aired. She played another recurring character, Teri Miller on CSI: Crime Scene Investigation. She appeared in the show's first and third seasons.

She starred as Audrey Westin in the short-lived mystery series Strange Luck which lasted one season. Other television credits include Crime Story, Tour of Duty, and the serial drama Skin, which was cancelled after just eight episodes, and she guest starred in an episode of The Closer.

Death 
Gidley died at her home in Seabrook, New Hampshire, on April 16, 2018, aged 52. The cause of death had not been made public as of April 30, 2018.

Filmography

Film

Television

Documentary 
 1997 Scratch the Surface
 2014 Moving Through Time: Fire Walk with Me Memories (Video short)

References

External links
 

1965 births
2018 deaths
20th-century American actresses
21st-century American actresses
Actresses from Massachusetts
Actresses from New Hampshire
American film actresses
American television actresses
Female models from Massachusetts
People from Nashua, New Hampshire